Pinkston may refer to:

Places 
Pinkston, a sub-area of Sighthill, Glasgow, Scotland

People 
Clarence Pinkston (1900–1961), American diver
Rob Pinkston (born 1988), American actor
Russell Pinkston (born 1949), American Professor of Composition
Ryan Pinkston (born 1988), American actor
Todd Pinkston (born 1977), American football player

Organisations 
L. G. Pinkston High School, a high school in the Dallas Independent School District
Pinkston Watersports, an artificial whitewater course in Glasgow, Scotland

See also 

 Pinxton, a settlement in Derbyshire, England
 Pinxton Porcelain